Hylehurst, also known as the John W. Fries House, is a historic home located at Winston-Salem, Forsyth County, North Carolina, United States.  It was designed by Henry Hudson Holly and built in 1884. The house is a three-story, Queen Anne style dwelling. It features projecting gable ends with timbering and scalloped shingles and a wraparound verandah. It was built for John W. Fries, a prominent Winston-Salem industrialist, whose father built the Arista Cotton Mill Complex.

The house was listed on the National Register of Historic Places in 1983.

References

Houses on the National Register of Historic Places in North Carolina
Queen Anne architecture in North Carolina
Houses completed in 1884
Houses in Winston-Salem, North Carolina
National Register of Historic Places in Winston-Salem, North Carolina